Siegfried IV, known as Siegfried von Algertshausen or von Algishausen (died 26 June 1288), was the prince-bishop of Augsburg from 1286 until his death.

He attended the school at Augsburg Cathedral and became a canon there by 1255. In 1263 he became archdeacon and in 1269 the provost of Buxheim.

In July 1286, he was elected to succeed Hartmann von Dillingen as bishop. He was consecrated at the Synod of Würzburg in March 1287. He died in Augsburg on 26 June 1288 and was buried in the cathedral. He left some houses and farms to the cathedral chapter.

Bibliography 
 
 
 

1288 deaths
Roman Catholic bishops of Augsburg